Konex Foundation (Fundación Konex)is an Argentine cultural non-profit organization created in 1980 to promote, stimulate, help, and participate in any form of cultural, educational, intellectual, artistic, social, philanthropic, scientific or sports initiative, work, and enterprise, in their most relevant aspects, as defined by its founder and president, Dr. Luis Ovsejevich.

The Konex Foundation provides scholarships and individual grants and also sponsors and stimulates group activities through subsidies and assistance to meritorious ideas and enterprises.

Konex Awards
The Konex Awards, also created in 1980, where conceived as a way to reward the Argentine personalities and institutions of different fields, as well as to stimulate the beginners.

Even though the awards are handed every year, they are organised by cycles of 10 years. Each year with a different field in the following order: Sports, Entertainment, Visual Arts, Science and Technology, Literature, Popular Music, Humanities, Communication-Journalism, Institutions-Communities-Companies and Classical Music.

The Konex Awards are internationally recognised since its creation, and are one of the most important and distinguished in Argentina.

Foundation's activities in the area of classical music 

Among the foundation's activities there's a program to promote amongst young people different cultural expression such as opera, ballet and classical music, in adapted version.

Other activities of the Foundation 

The Foundation also supports different science projects and plastic artistic activities, holds painting exhibitions and has its own collection.

The Ciudad Cultural Konex venue hosts music and arts events organized by the Konex Foundation, from classical music to contemporaneous percussion group La bomba de tiempo.

See also
Francisco Ernesto Baralle
Marcelo Bonevardi
Jorge Cumbo
Darío Sztajnszrajber

References

External links

Fundación Konex Official Site
History of Konex Awards at Clarín 

Argentine culture
Foundations based in Argentina
1980 establishments in Argentina